{{Infobox football biography
| name = Billy Thompson
| fullname = William Thompson
| image = 
| caption = 
| birth_date = 
| birth_place = Cupertino, California, United States
| height = 
| position = Forward, midfielder
| collegeyears1 = 1986–1990
| college1 = UCLA
| years1 = 1988–1989
| years2 = 1991–1995
| years3 = 1995
| years4 = 1995
| years5 = 1995–1996
| years6 = 1996–1999
| clubs1 = Los Angeles Heat
| clubs2 = Pau FC
| clubs3 = Rajpracha
| clubs4 = Hawaii Tsunami
| clubs5 = Tampa Bay Terror (indoor)
| clubs6 = Columbus Crew
| caps1 = ?
| caps2 = 
| caps3 = 
| caps4 = 14
| caps5 = 40
| caps6 = 82
| goals1 = 10
| goals2 = 
| goals3 = 
| goals4 = 21
| goals5 = 30
| goals6 = 4
| nationalyears1 = 1988
| nationalteam1 = United States
| nationalcaps1 = 1
| nationalgoals1 = 0
| manageryears1 = 1999
| manageryears2 = 2000
| manageryears3 = 2000–2008
| manageryears4 = 2000–2010
| manageryears5 = 2008–2015
| manageryears6 = 2017–
| managerclubs1 = Ohio Wesleyan women (assistant)
| managerclubs2 = Ohio Wesleyan men (assistant)
| managerclubs3 = Worthington United SC (director of coaching)| managerclubs4 = Wellington HS Dukes
| managerclubs5 = Crew SC Academy
| managerclubs6 = Capital Crusaders (assistant)
}}William Thompson''' (born May 5, 1968) is a retired U.S. soccer player who is currently an aisstant coach with Capital University. He earned one caps with the U.S. national team and played three seasons in Major League Soccer with the Columbus Crew.

College
Thompson, born in Cupertino, California, attended UCLA where he played as a forward on the men's soccer team from 1986 to 1990. Thompson earned first team All American honors as a senior. That year he was the captain of the Bruins team which won the NCAA championship. Thompson was also the 1990 ISAA Player of the Year and finished his time at UCLA with 42 goals and 27 assists.

Early career
While playing with UCLA, Thompson spent the 1988 and 1989 collegiate offseason with the Los Angeles Heat of the Western Soccer Alliance. In 1988, he was named to the WSA All Star team.

Following his last season at UCLA, Thompson was a member of the U.S. soccer team at the 1991 Summer World University Games.  He then moved to France to play for FC Pau from 1991-1994. He was with the team from 1991 to 1994 before returning to the United States for a short spell with professional beach soccer which led him to compete in the Beach Soccer World Championship in Rio de Janeiro, Brazil a year later. In 1995, he spent a single season with the Hawaii Tsunami of the USISL. As a Member of the US Men's national team, Thompson played in the 1991 President's Cup in Seoul Korea where he was named the league's Offensive MVP. He also played in the World University Games in 1991 in Sheffield, England, the 1991 Gold Cup in  Vancouver, Canada, the 1989 Tournoir Espoirs in Toulon, France, and the 1988 Marlboro Cup in Miami, Florida. He also competed in the President's Club, and was named the league's Offensive MVP. That same year he also guest played with Raj Pracha'' FC of Thailand.

MLS
On February 6–7, 1996, Major League Soccer (MLS) held its first draft. The Columbus Crew selected Thompson in the third round (21st overall) ahead of fellow Bruins Eddie Lewis, Frankie Hejduk, and Ante Razov. At the time he was playing indoor soccer with the Tampa Bay Terror of the National Professional Soccer League. Thompson went on to play four seasons with the Crew. However, at the end of his second season, in which he saw time in only six games (four as a starter), the Crew did not protect Thompson during the expansion draft. The next season, he came back strong, appearing in twenty-nine games. However, he retired at the end of the 1999 season finishing with 4 goals and 18 assists for his MLS career.

Coaching

After retiring from professional soccer, Thompson remained in Columbus​ to pursue a career youth soccer development. From 2000-2001, he served as the assistant coach to the Ohio Wesleyan men's and women's soccer team​s​. He also served as head coach for the Wellington High School girls' team​ from 2000-2011. In 2000, Thompson joined Worthington United, a local youth soccer club, growing the pr​ogram from six teams to 60+,  ​leading the 1990 boys team to the Ohio State Cup semifinals in 2006 and 2007, and to their first state title in 2008. In 2008 Worthington United ​partnered with the Columbus Crew where Thompson became the Director of Coaching and Player Development, and Academy Director for the Crew Soccer Academy of the ​n​​ewly formed Major League Soccer​ Youth Development Initiative. Thompson was the Director of Coaching for the Worthington Crew Juniors and Crew Juniors Soccer programs from 2008 to 2015. He was awarded Ohio South's coach of the year honors in 2005 and holds a USSF Youth Technical Director License and a USSF National "A" License. Since 2016, In 2016 Thompson transitioned to the Ohio Premier Soccer Club where he is presently the Ohio Premier Boys Director of Coaching and Player Development/Technical Director.​  In 2018, the Ohio Premier Boys ECNL U-19 team won the National Championship. Starting May 15, 2022, he will be the Executive & Technical Director of the Los Gatos United Soccer Club.

National team
Thompson earned one cap with the U.S. national team. His one cap came in a 1–0 victory over Costa Rica on June 14, 1988. He played seventeen total games with the national team, but sixteen of those were not full internationals.

Personal
Billy and his wife, Shawnda, reside in the Columbus area with their two children.

References

External links
 MLS Stats
 Worthington United
 Career summary

Living people
1968 births
Association football midfielders
Association football forwards
All-American men's college soccer players
American expatriate soccer players
American expatriate sportspeople in France
American soccer coaches
American soccer players
Columbus Crew players
Expatriate footballers in France
Hawaii Tsunami players
Los Angeles Heat players
Major League Soccer players
National Professional Soccer League (1984–2001) players
People from Cupertino, California
Soccer players from California
Tampa Bay Terror players
UCLA Bruins men's soccer players
United States men's international soccer players
USISL players
Western Soccer Alliance players
Pau FC players
Columbus Crew non-playing staff
High school soccer coaches in the United States
Capital Comets men's soccer coaches
Expatriate footballers in Thailand
American expatriate sportspeople in Thailand